Dmitry Igorevich Azarov (Russian: Дмитрий Игоревич Азаров; born on 9 August 1970), is a Russian politician who is currently the 4th Governor of Samara Oblast since 17 September 2018.

He is also the secretary of the Samara regional branch of the United Russia party since 8 November 8, 2019, and is a  member of the Bureau of the Supreme Council of the United Russia party.

Azarov had served as a member of the Federation Council from the executive authority of Samara Oblast from 2014 to 2017, the head of the city district of Samara 2010 to 2014, and the Minister of Nature Management, Forestry and Environmental Protection of Samara Oblast from 2008 to 2010.

In July 2022, he is under British sanctions for supporting Russia's war against Ukraine.

Biography

Dmitry Azarov was born on 9 August 1970 in Kuibyshev (present day Samara). His great-grandfather was the handicraft head of the city of Smolensk, who was loved and respected by the inhabitants. Until now, a monument erected to him has been preserved.  Both of his grandfathers are officers, and each of his grandmothers are a doctor and a teacher. His father, a native of Samara, at various times worked at the planning institute, Vodokanal and Kuibyshevmelivodkhoz, while his mother, a who lived in Magadan, worked most of the time at the Kuibyshevoblbyttekhnika production association as an inspector of the technical control department, and soon became the chairman of the trade union committee. Dmitry has an older brother, Oleg.

He started working at school. Being a student of the 7th grade, he packed pasta together with a friend. In his student years, he worked as an asphalt paver.

In 1987, he attended the secondary school No. 132. His favorite subjects were physics and mathematics.

He worked as a software engineer in a private company, for some time he worked in the territorial department of the tax service.

In 1992, he attended the Samara State Technical University with a degree in Systems Engineering.

In 1994, he finished education at the Buzuluk Financial and Economic College of the Ministry of Finance of the Russia (now the Buzuluk branch of the Financial University under the Government of Russia).

From 1995 to 1998, he was the deputy director for Economics of the Samara Plant of Boiler-Auxiliary Equipment and Pipelines.

From 1998 to 2001, he was the deputy director for Economics and Preparation of Production at the Sintezkauchuk plant, then worked in the structural production associations Volgapromkhim, which united six enterprises of the Samara Oblast. Between 2001 and 2006, he became the General Director of Srednevolzhskaya Gas Company LLC.

In 2003, at the Russian State University of Trade and Economics, he defended his dissertation for the degree of candidate of economic sciences on the topic “Improving the organizational and economic mechanism for forming the profitability of a commercial organization.

In 2006, Azarov was appointed First Deputy Head of the Samara City District by Viktor Tarkhov. In the city administration, he supervised the activities of the departments of finance, economic development, urban economy and ecology, industrial policy, entrepreneurship and communications.

In 2008, Azarov was appointed by Governor of Samara Oblast Vladimir Artyakov as Minister of Nature Management, Forestry and Environmental Protection of the Samara Oblast. In the position of minister, he introduced a uniform with shoulder straps for the Ministry of Natural Resources, Forestry and Environmental Protection of the Samara Oblast, approved by the Decree of the Government of the Samara Oblast of December 31, 2009 No. 720, however, wearing uniforms was not mandatory, so uniform samples remained only in the Decree.

In 2009, he was included in the first hundred personnel reserve of the President of Russia Dmitry Medvedev.

In 2010, the future mayor of the urban district of Tolyatti Sergey Andreyev was appointed the new minister.

In 2010, at Governor Artyakov's initiative, Azarov was approved and elected as the Head of the city district of Samara from United Russia in the elections of the head of the city, receiving 66.94% of the vote. He officially took office on 15 October 15.

In 2012, Azarov was one of the authors of the idea of "open government" and "municipal filter" in the elections of heads of Russian regions.

On 10 October 2014, at the initiative of Governor Nikolay Merkushkin, Mayor Azarov assumed the position of a member of the Federation Council of the executive authority from the Samara Olast, taking the post of Chairman of the Federation Council Committee on Federal Structure, Regional Policy, Local Self-Government and Affairs of the North, replacing Konstantin Titov in the Federation Council and resigning the powers of the head of the city.

Governor of Samara Oblast

He has the class rank of Acting State Councilor of the Samara Region, 1st class, in accordance with the highest group of positions in the civil service.

In 2017, he appointed Advisor to the Governor Viktor Kudryashov as the First Deputy Chairman of the Government of the Samara Region, with whom he worked in the city administration of Samara. In the same year, he recommended Yelena Lapushkina to the City Duma for the post of head of Samara.

In the same year, he returned the political strategist Viktor Kuznetsov to the regional government, whom the media call the gray cardinal, appointing him deputy chief of staff of the governor of the Samara Oblast.

On 25 September 2017, by decree of the President of Russia, Azarov was appointed Acting Governor of the Oblast "until the person elected as the Governor of the Samara Oblast takes office.".

In 2018, Yevgeny Chudayev, the son of the owner of the construction and development company Drevo, was appointed Minister of Construction of the Samara Oblast.

Director of the Samara Youth House MBU Sergey Burtsev was appointed Head of the Department for Youth Affairs of the Samara Oblast.

Sergey Markov, mayor of the city of Novokuibyshevsk, was appointed Minister of Energy and Housing and Public Utilities.

Farit Mukhametshin, Russian Ambassador to Moldova, was appointed Senator to the Federation Council from the Government of the Samara Oblast. Mikhail Ratmanov,  the Minister of Health of the Republic of North Ossetia, was appointed Minister of Health of the Samara Oblast.

Dmitry Bogdanov, head of the Department of Economic Development of the Togliatti Administration, was appointed Minister of Economic Development and Investments of the Samara Oblast.

Mikhail Zhdanov, Deputy Minister of the Ministry of Economic Development of the Region, was appointed Minister of Industry and Trade of the Samara Oblast.

Viktor Akopyan, editor-in-chief of the Prosveshchenie Publishing House, was appointed Minister of Regional Education. Nikolay Abashin, head of the Kinelsky district, was appointed Minister of Agriculture and Food of the Samara Oblast.

In the same year, Zhigulevsk recommended the head of the Governor's office, Dmitry Kholin, to the post of head.

On 9 September 2018, he won the first round of elections for the Governor of the Samara Oblast gaining 72.63% of the vote. On September 17, 2018, he took office as the Governor of the Samara Oblast at the Samara Academic Opera and Ballet Theatre, taking an oath of allegiance to the residents of the Samara Oblast.

In December 2018, by the decision of the delegates of the XVIII Congress of the United Russia party, held on December 7–8, 2018, he was introduced to the Supreme Council of the party.

He began his gubernatorial activity by returning a significant part of the social payments to pensioners and beneficiaries, canceled by his predecessor, Merkushkin.

Unemployment in the region in 2018 decreased by 0.5% compared to the previous year. The level of the average salary in 2018 increased by 10%. Mining production in 2018 increased by 32.5%, manufacturing - by 11%, car sales - by 16%. Governor Azarov successfully solving the problem of "deceived equity holders": during his leadership, the rights of 1.5 thousand participants in shared construction have been restored.

The region entered the top ten of the all-Russian rating of entities in terms of public procurement transparency. The degree of tension subsided significantly in the most problematic area of the region - in Togliatti: in the second half of 2018, more than 5.5 thousand jobs were created here.

Azarov appointed regional human rights commissioner Irina Skupova, former regional prosecutor Aleksandr Yefremov, coordinator of initiative groups of equity holders of Russia Svetlana Drozdova and showman Dmitry Kolchin as advisers to the governor.

In 2019, Viktoria Katkova, head of the municipal property management committee of the administration of Novokuibyshevsk, was appointed the new head of the State Housing Inspectorate of the Samara Oblast. Boris Illarionov, deputy director of the St. Petersburg State Academic Ballet Theater, was appointed the new Minister of Culture for the competition, which caused a lawsuit with another participant in the competition, Dilyara Kotikova.

The newly elected Minister of Culture himself appointed Natalya Tonkovidova from the Department of Culture of Togliatti as his deputy.

In May 2019, Azarov agreed with the idea to expand the area of green spaces in the regional center, which was expressed by local residents during the Line of Success business forum. The governor instructed the head of Samara, Yelena Lapushkina, to implement this project.

In Samara, in 2016, the Blooming City municipal program was adopted, calculated until 2020. Now the department of urban economy and ecology, on behalf of the governor, is working on additional proposals for greening the city. After that, they are transferred to the expert community: landscape designers, urbanists, architects, as well as the Samara city community.

In total, about 168 thousand square meters of flowers, 8.5 thousand shrubs and more than 2.5 thousand trees are planned to be planted in Samara in 2019.

In 2020, Aleksandr Mordvinov was appointed the new Minister of Energy and Housing and Public Utilities of the Samara Oblast. In the same year, Azarov initiated the reconstruction of the Togliatti Embankment. In the same year, he launched the construction of a new bridge across the Volga River in the Klimovka area, the length of which was 3.75 km.

Since 21 December 2020, he is a member of the Presidium of the State Council of Russia.

In 2021, Olga Golodets’s daughter, Tatyana Mrdulyash worked as deputy director of the Tretyakov Gallery in Moscow, was appointed the new Minister of Culture of the Samara Oblast. In March 2012, Azarov appointed Sergey Kobylyan (sky) as the Minister of Sports of the Samara Region, replacing Dmitry Shlyakhtin In the same year, he recommended the chief physician Nikolay Renz to the post of head of the city of Togliatti.

On 16 July 2021, he transferred the head of the Governor's Office — Vice Governor Vladimir Terentyev to the Samara Region Public Road Maintenance Agency, with whom he worked for many years in the city administration of Samara and who advocated the development of municipal road activities.

Social activity

From 2011 to 2014, as Head of Samara, he was the president of the Association of cities of the Volga region, vice-president of the Union of Russian cities, vice-president of the Eurasian branch of the United Cities and Local Authorities World Organization, and the deputy chairman of the All-Russian Council of Local Self-Government for the Volga Federal District.

From 2014 to 2017, he was the chairman of the All-Russian Council of Local Self-Government (VSMS) was elected at the V Congress.

Social networks

He actively uses the social networks Twitter and Instagram, through which he communicates with residents and gives instructions to officials who have also created their own accounts.

As of July 2020, the Governor's Twitter account had 83,000 followers, and Instagram had 227,000 followers. In the spring of 2019, Azarov was in the TOP-20 heads of regions of the Russian Federation in terms of being mentioned in social media, ranking 13th with 15.09 thousand messages. In the rating of blogger governors, he is in 18th place with an CI of 22.2.

In November 2021, an Instagram user posted a photo with Azarov in the cabin of a business class aircraft that was heading to Dubai, the Azarov flew on vacation. The inscription on the picture read: "I'm flying with my beloved on his business .. I love him." Later, the girl admitted that the photo was a joke, and the governor's press service launched the hash tag "#Favorite Governor". After that, however, Azarov's account on the social network was blocked.

Criticism

In 2010, an ecological disaster occurred in the city of Tolyatti: more than 8,000 hectares of forest burned down due to forest fires. In 2017, a lawyer from Togliatti went to court with a complaint under Article 125 of the Code of Criminal Procedure against the TFR, demanding that a criminal case be opened under Article 293 of the Criminal Code of the Russian Federation “Negligence” against the Governor of the Samara Oblast, Artyakov, the former Mayor of Togliatti Anatoly Pushkov, and also the former that period by the regional minister of natural resources and environmental protection, Azarov. However, the Samara District Court dismissed the complaint.

In 2018, as governor of Samara Oblast, he allowed the bankruptcy and liquidation of Gazbank, the Ministry of Property of the region did not become a shareholder.

From 2019 to 2021, he did not agree three times with the decision of the Duma of Togliatti to abolish the maintenance of 35 microdistrict managers in Togliatti, which, according to the deputies of the City Duma, are useless in the face of a budget deficit and duplicate the work of TOS, three times allocated funding from the regional budget for their maintenance 21 million rubles. For 2022, the content of the managers of microdistricts in Togliatti amounted to 32.6 million rubles.

In November 2019, Kotikova, a participant in the competition for the position of Minister of Culture of the Samara Oblast, director of the Patriot television company, filed a lawsuit demanding that the decision of Governor Dmitry Azarov and the competition commission be canceled, but the court refused to satisfy her demands.

Family
He is married to his wife. Ellina Azarova, where he met her as she was a graduate of Samara State University, while still in elementary school. He married her during his third year. The couple has two daughters, Polina and Alyona. The eldest daughter, a graduate of MGIMO, lives in Moscow; the youngest sings and plays in the theater, has victories in international competitions.

His older brother, Oleg, works at the JSC "Baltic Construction Company of St. Petersburg" (JSC BSK), which includes the Samara contractor GK "Volgatransstroy", a former member of the town planning council under the governor of the Samara Oblast. Volgatransstroy Group of Companies was awarded contracts for the reconstruction of the Samara metro, the Sports Palace, the building of the Sixth Court of Cassation for a total of 3.5 billion rubles.

Hobbies

From early childhood, he has been fond of basketball. He not only played basketball himself, but also coached children, and has led the basketball section.

He also reads a lot of fiction. His favorite authors are Fyodor Dostoyevsky and Bulgakov.

References

1970 births
Living people
United Russia politicians
Governors of Samara Oblast
Mayors of places in Russia
Members of the Federation Council of Russia (after 2000)
Politicians from Samara, Russia
Samara State Technical University alumni